A damned or damn yellow composite (DYC) is any of the numerous species of composite flowers (family Asteraceae) that have yellow flowers and can be difficult to tell apart in the field.  It is a jocular term, and sometimes reserved for those yellow composites of no particular interest.  Notable individuals who referred to these flowers as "DYCs" include Oliver Sacks and Lady Bird Johnson.

See also
Little brown mushroom
Little brown job (a hard to identify bird)

References

External links

Use during urban plant survey

Slang
Flowers
Asteraceae